E. E. Rehmus, also alternatively given as Ed Rehmus, Edward Rehmus or Edward E. Rehmus (June 1929 – March 2004), was an American occultist, linguist, Egyptologist, classicist, writer, editor, translator, illustrator, cartoonist, and occasional graphic artist primarily known for being the author of The Magician's Dictionary.

Biography

Early life and youth 
Joseph Haskew, his long-term partner, wrote of Rehmus's early life and youth:

Maturity 
Haskew further adds:

Involvement with High-IQ societies 
As a polymath and philomath, Rehmus was actively involved with the quest to understand and expand human intelligence, himself being a member of several high-IQ support groups. Among these affiliations was his involvement with the San Francisco area Mensa society; he often contributed to that local society's publication, The Ecphorizer. His contributor notice from The Ecphorizer runs thus:

Author of The Magician's Dictionary 
His public reputation rests mainly on his contribution to the study of the occult through his renowned book The Magician's Dictionary, a vast pseudo-encyclopaedic work first published in 1990 that proposes a re-evaluation of some of the core building blocks of modern belief structures through definition and commentary on key words and phrases, from "Aaron" to "Zuvuya".

Other activities 
Apart from founding and editing various magazines and journals (sometimes under pseudonyms), Rehmus was a regular contributor to numerous and diverse scholarly and amateur publications, providing articles, texts, artworks, and even erudite crossword puzzles. While he remained an obscure figure to the public eye during his lifetime, the posthumous volume The Magic of Ed Rehmus, compiled and edited by Fred Vaughan and published in 2006, sheds light on his personal life and many other previously inaccessible aspects of his thought, wide interests, and activities.

Selected works

Books and articles 
I'm Over Here. Sausalito: Contact Editions/Angel Island Publications, 1962.
The Magician's Dictionary: An Apocalyptic Cyclopaedia of Advanced Magic(k)al Arts and Alternate Meanings. 1st edition. Los Angeles: Feral House, March 1990. . .
The Magician's Dictionary: An Apocalyptic Cyclopaedia of Advanced Magic(k)al Arts and Alternate Meanings. 2nd edition. October 1996. (Available on-line here.)
The Magic of Ed Rehmus. Edited by Fred Vaughan. Seattle: Russell Vaughan, 2006. (Available to download here and to buy from Lulu.com.)

Contributions to The Ecphorizer 

"Sermon No. P=P+1 (IF P=502 THEN 86)". The Ecphorizer, Issue 26, October 1983.
"Prognosis Negative". The Ecphorizer, Issue 28, December 1983.
"The Miracle of Pennsylvania Avenue". The Ecphorizer, Issue 29, January 1984.
"Tennis, Anyone?". The Ecphorizer, Issue 30, February 1984.
"Porphyry & Pomegranates". The Ecphorizer, Issue 41, January 1985.
"Deeper Into Hemp". The Ecphorizer, Issue 42, February 1985.
"An Aëroplane for Icarus (An Achronism) I". The Ecphorizer, Issue 43, March 1985.
"An Aëroplane for Icarus (An Achronism) II". The Ecphorizer, Issue 44, April 1985.
"An Aëroplane for Icarus (An Achronism) III". The Ecphorizer, Issue 46, June 1985.
"An Aëroplane for Icarus (An Achronism) IV". The Ecphorizer, Issue 47, July 1985.
"An Aëroplane for Icarus (An Achronism) V". The Ecphorizer, Issue 48, August 1985.
"An Aëroplane for Icarus (An Achronism) VI". The Ecphorizer, Issue 49, September 1985.
"An Aëroplane for Icarus (An Achronism) VII". The Ecphorizer, Issue 50, October 1985.
"An Aëroplane for Icarus (An Achronism) VIII". The Ecphorizer, Issue 51, November 1985.
"An Aëroplane for Icarus (An Achronism) IX". The Ecphorizer, Issue 52, December 1985.
"The Cream of Christ ". The Ecphorizer, Issue 54, February 1986.
"Seven Heavens". The Ecphorizer, Issue 55, March 1986.
"Your Roving Wordsleuth". The Ecphorizer, Issue 59, October 1986.
"Harry J. Anslinger". The Ecphorizer, Issue 62, January 1987.
"Two Cosmologies". The Ecphorizer, Issue 63, February 1987.
"The Nature of Translation". The Ecphorizer, Issue 69, August 1987.
"The Something-From-Nothing World". The Ecphorizer, Issue 70, September 1987.

Translations 
Evola, Julius. The Hermetic Tradition: Symbols and Teachings of the Royal Art. Trans. by E. E. Rehmus. Rochester: Inner Traditions, 1995. . . (Link to the Inner Traditions website's book page).
Vincenot, Henri. The Prophet of Compostela: A Novel of Apprenticeship and Initiation. Trans. by E. E. Rehmus. Rochester: Inner Traditions, 1995. . . (Link to the Inner Traditions website's book page. Limited preview available on-line from Google Books here. )

Notes and references

Notes

References 

1929 births
2004 deaths
Esotericists
American LGBT writers
20th-century American non-fiction writers
American occultists
Linguists from the United States
American illustrators
American Egyptologists
American LGBT scientists
Mensans
20th-century American translators
20th-century linguists
20th-century LGBT people
21st-century LGBT people
20th-century American male writers